Remigius “Remy” Wellen (born 1 September 1938) is a German former professional ice hockey forward.

Wellen played his entire career with his hometown team Krefelder EV 1936, now known as the Krefeld Pinguine. He also became the trainer of the team in 1978. Wellen played in the 1961 Ice Hockey World Championships for West Germany.

His father Karl Wellen, was one of the founding members of the team, then known as Krefelder Eislauf-Vereins.

References

External links

1938 births
Living people
German ice hockey forwards
Krefeld Pinguine players
Sportspeople from Krefeld